Longitarsus succineus is a species of flea beetle in the family Chrysomelidae. It is found in North America and Europe.

References

Further reading

 
 

Longitarsus
Articles created by Qbugbot
Beetles described in 1859
Beetles of North America
Beetles of Europe